Mohibbul Hasan (1908–21 April 1999) was an Indian historian. He wrote books about history of pre-independent India.

Education and career
After his early education at Lucknow, he went to London University for higher study. After his return, he started his teaching career at Punjab. After that he was appointed in Calcutta, Aligarh universities. From 1963 he became head of department of History in Jamia Millia Islamia and University of Kashmir.

Works
In 1951, Hasan wrote his first book, History of Tipu Sultan. Later he wrote Kashmir under Sultans, Waqai-i-Manzili-Rum, Babur- founder of the Mughal Empire in India etc.

References

Academic staff of Jamia Millia Islamia
1908 births
1999 deaths
20th-century Indian historians
Academic staff of the University of Kashmir
Academic staff of Aligarh Muslim University
Academic staff of the University of Calcutta
Alumni of the University of London
20th-century Indian Muslims